Tom Fenoughty may refer to:

Tom Fenoughty (footballer, born 1905) (1905–2001), English footballer
Tom Fenoughty (footballer, born 1941), English footballer